Jomonte Suvisheshangal ( Jomon's Gospels) is a 2017 Indian Malayalam-language family drama film directed by Sathyan Anthikkad and written by Iqbal Kuttippuram. The film stars Dulquer Salmaan, Mukesh and Aishwarya Rajesh. Aishwarya Rajesh made her Malayalam debut through this film.

Plot
Jomon is an irresponsible son, the third, of self-made businessman and widower Vincent. The story, set in Thrissur, revolves around Vincent's family, which focuses on the relationship between the father and the son. Vincent, who is very fond of his son, constantly tries to instill in him a sense of responsibility, only to be met with failure. 

Jomon falls in love with Catherine, whom he meets in the church while attending the Sunday mass on his father's insistence. Vincent also puts Jomon in charge of gent's wear store so that his son develops a sense of maturity. However, much to Vincent's dismay, Jomon sells it to the store manager, for an amount of 40 lakh. It is later revealed that Jomon sold the store, along with his expensive motorcycle, to invest in and become the managing partner of a textile store in Tiruppur along with his friend Mushtaq.

Meanwhile, a financial catastrophe befalls Vincent. He loses all his property and is evicted from his house. Abandoned by all other family members, he joins Jomon in Thiruppur where they begin to live a modest life. Jomon is forced to terminate his relationship with Catherine due to the family's newfound financial constraints.

Jomon's life in Thiruppur is equally turbulent as the new business venture fails as a result of Mushtaq's extravagant lifestyle. He starts working as a salesman for a textile company, during the course of which he befriends Vaidehi, an accountant at a textile manufacturing company he happens to visit on business. Vincent, who also has difficulties adjusting to the new lifestyle, takes up the job of a tailor to fund his expensive habit of smoking imported cigarettes.

After a series of setbacks in their business, Jomon and Mushtaq, along with Vaidehi, manage to successfully build a new business venture. Soon, Jomon is able to buy back Vincent's old house and the family reunites with new lessons learnt. In the end it is revealed to Vincent (who thought his son had only learned the importance of money but not of relationships) that Jomon had fallen in love with Vaidehi, who moved into Thrissur along with her father.

Cast

 Dulquer Salmaan as Jomon T. Vincent
 Mukesh as Vincent, Jomon's father
 Anupama Parameswaran as Catherine
 Aishwarya Rajesh as Vaidehi Perumal
 Shivaji Guruvayoor as Ravunni
 Manobala as Perumal
 Jacob Gregory as Muzthaq
 Indu Thampy as Dr. Jeslin Alphonse, Jomon's sister-in-law 
 Innocent as Palodan
 Muthumani as Laly, Jomon's sister
 Vinu Mohan as Dr. Alphonse Vincent, Jomon's brother
 Irshad as Joshy
 Nandhu as Dr. Kuriakose
 Rasna Pavithran as Tessa
 Rahul Ravi as Tessa's husband
 Disney James as Tony
 Ashvin Mathew as David
 Sethulakshmi as T. C. Mariyamma
 Harish Siva as friend
 Chembil Ashokan
 Vinod Kedamangalam

Filming
Principal photography commenced from August 2016 in Thrissur. The second schedule was started on 21 October in Tirupur. Pollachi was the other location.

Soundtrack

The music and score for the film is composed by Vidyasagar with lyrics penned by Rafeeq Ahammed. Vidyasagar is working with Sathyan Anthikad for the third time. The complete album was released by Muzik247 in their official YouTube channel on 2 December 2016. The film had three songs.

Release 
Initially, Jomonte Suvisheshangal was scheduled to release on 16 December 2016, but later pushed its date and released on 19 January 2017 due to Kerala theater strike. The movie was released in Dubai on 1 February 2017.

Reception

Box office 
Jomonte Suvisheshangal collected ₹24 crore from Kerala alone, ₹5.6 crore from rest of India, ₹9.97 crore from UAE-GCC and ₹4.1 crore from rest of the World box office. The film ran for 60 days in its theatres and it collected around ₹43.67 crore from Worldwide box office.

Critical reception 
S.R. Praveen of The Hindu wrote "This is the Sathyan Anthikkad version of what you have seen in the similarly named Jacobinte Swargarajyam, it's all about the chemistry between the father and the son, something which we have seen in quite a number of Sathyan movies".
The Times of India gave 3 out of 5 stars stating "Jomon’s tale can definitely be a hit with the section of audience for who relate to elements like family sentiments, human traits of endurance and parent-child bond. The movie can also win the hearts of fans of Dulquer Salmaan and his mannerisms as the actor indeed comes across as charming in a few sequences".
India Today gave 3 out of 5 stars stating "Jomonte Suveshishangal soars high with its pleasing story. The film itself is one of those enjoyable long rides one would take with a Yesudas song".

Anu James of International Business Times wrote "Jomonte Suviseshangal is a typical Sathyan Anthikad movie, old wine served in new bottle with a familiar and predictable storyline. Nevertheless, it is a feel-good entertainer that is well handled by Dulquer and Mukesh, and teaches us that one cannot taste success throughout as one will have to face ups and downs in life".
The Indian Express gave 3 out of 5 stars stating "Jomonte Suveshishangal is a delightful film written by Iqbal Kuttippuram. The film narrates the uplifting journey of its title character, played by Dulquer Salmaan. Mukesh and Dulquer as father and son are delightful".
IndiaGlitz gave 4 out of 5 stars stating "This is Dulquer’s movie from the word go and he has given a matured performance. Songs adds to the movie and is there only wherever necessary. Frames are pleasant and the edits add colour to them. ‘Jomonte Suvisheshangal’ is a fun movie, not to be missed. Amen!".

Home media 
Though initially, the movie didn't have a streaming partner, it strarted streaming on ManoramaMax after the launch of the service.
The Telugu version Andamaina Jeevitham was released on Amazon Prime Video for streaming.

Awards and nominations

References 

2017 films
Films directed by Sathyan Anthikad
Films scored by Vidyasagar
Indian comedy-drama films
Films set in Kerala
Films shot in Thrissur
Films shot in Pollachi